Rushani is one of the Pamir languages spoken in Afghanistan and Tajikistan. 
Rushani is relatively closer to all Northern Pamiri languages sub-group whether it is Shughni, Yazgulami, Sarikuli or Oroshori sharing many grammatical and vocabulary similarity with all of them especially with Shughni and thus some linguists consider it a dialect of Shughni.

Rushan is divided into two parts by Panj river where on right bank along Bartang river to the East located Rushan district of GBAO, Tajikistan and on the left side located several villages of Roshan area in northern part of the Sheghnan District, in the Badakhshan Province of Afghanistan and the Gorno-Badakhshan Autonomous Region in Tajikistan. Afghani Roshan consists of six villages including Rubotin, Paguor, Chawed, York, Shaikhin and Chasnud, five of which are located on the bank of the river Panj, which meets at the border of Tajikistan. Most Rushani speakers belong to the Ismaili branch of Shi'a Islam.

Language use
Rushani, like Shughni, is only used in unofficial settings. All of the children in the community learn Rushani as their first language and rely heavily on it until they enroll in school. It is only then that they learn the official language of the country. Adult speakers are all bi- or tri-lingual in Tajik and Russian.

Traditionally Rushani was not a written language, with Rushani speakers writing in Persian.<ref name="Dodykhudoeva, Leila. 2007">Dodykhudoeva, L. 2007: Revitalization of minority languages: comparative dictionary of key cultural terms in the languages and dialects of the Shugni-Rushani group. London: SOAS.</ref> Writing systems have been developed for the language using Cyrillic and Latin scripts, for example for use in translation of parts of the bible by the Institute for Bible Translation.

Verbs
Rushani is unusual in having a transitive alignment system – a so-called double-oblique clause structure – in the past tense. That is, in the past tense, the agent and object of a transitive verb are both marked, while the subject of an intransitive verb is not. In the present tense, the object of the transitive verb is marked, the other two roles are not – that is, a typical nominative–accusative alignment. See transitive alignment for examples.

Literature
Zarubin, I.I. Bartangskie i rushanskie teksty i slovar. Moskva : Izd-vo Akademii nauk SSSR, 1937.
Payne, John, "Pamir languages" in Compendium Linguarum Iranicarum, ed. Schmitt (1989), 417–444.
Payne, John. "The decay of ergativity in Pamir languages." Lingua'' 51:147-186.

References

External links
 Rushani  at the Endangered Languages Project

Pamir languages
Eastern Iranian languages
Languages of Tajikistan
Endangered languages of Iran
Endangered languages of Tajikistan